SM UC-1 was a German Type UC I minelayer submarine or U-boat in the German Imperial Navy during World War I. The U-boat had been ordered by November 1914 and was launched on 26 April 1915. She was commissioned into the German Imperial Navy on 5 July 1915 as SM UC-1. Mines laid by UC-1 in her 80 patrols were credited with sinking 41 ships. UC-1 disappeared after 18 July 1917. UC-1 was sunk on 24 July 1917 by F2B Felixstowe flying boat. Standard practice was to fly along the U boat and drop 2 250lb bombs astride it, hoping to cause leaks and give time for a destroyer to collect the submariners and sink it. On this occasion, by fluke, one bomb went through the conning tower and blew the base out of UC1. MFG Mill was awarded the DFC for this but he refused to wear it because of the total loss of life <london Gazette> <MFG Mill Diaries>

Design
A German Type UC I submarine, UC-1 had a displacement of  when at the surface and  while submerged. The submarine was powered by one Daimler-Motoren-Gesellschaft six-cylinder, four-stroke diesel engine producing , an electric motor producing , and one propeller shaft.

UC-1 was fitted with six  mine tubes, twelve UC 120 mines, and one  machine gun. She was built by AG Vulcan Stettin and her complement was fourteen crew members.

Summary of raiding history

References

Notes

Citations

Bibliography

 
 

German Type UC I submarines
U-boats commissioned in 1915
World War I submarines of Germany
Maritime incidents in 1917
U-boats sunk in 1917
1915 ships
World War I minelayers of Germany
Ships built in Hamburg
Missing U-boats of World War I